Ravitoto  is a traditional Malagasy cuisine. Ravitoto means “crushed cassava leaves”. These are specifically sweet cassava (cassava tree) leaves pounded with a mortar or meat grinder. It is cooked with garlic and very fatty pork. In other societies, coconut milk is used instead to cook cassava leaves, like mataba in the Comoros. Dried fish or small shrimp, called tsivaki, can be added.

This dish is simple to prepare, but it takes a long time to cook because the stew takes 30 minutes to an hour. There are several ravitoto recipes online, and there are several ways to cook it.

See also 

 Daun ubi tumbuk (Maritime South-East Asian Cuisine)

References 

Malagasy cuisine
Cassava dishes